The British School of Lomé (BSL) was established in 1983 to serve expatriate families based in Lomé, Togo.

Notable alumni
Umar Farouk Abdulmutallab, the "Underwear bomber" convicted of attempting to blow up Northwest Airlines Flight 253 to Detroit on Christmas Day 2009.
Efe Ukala, vice president and assistant general counsel on institutional investors at JPMorgan Chase.

See also

 List of international schools
 Education in Togo

References

External links
School website
Photographs of the British School of Lome by Mike Rimmer

International schools in Togo
British international schools in Africa
International Baccalaureate schools
Schools in Lomé